Mouw is a surname. Notable people with the surname include:

Johan Andreas Dèr Mouw (1863–1919), Dutch poet and philosopher
Marshall Mouw, American politician
Richard Mouw (born 1940), American theologian and philosopher

See also
Mow (surname)